Mesme Taşbağ (born September 7, 1981) is a Turkish visually impaired judoka (disability class B3) competing in the heavyweight (+70 kg) division. She is a physician by profession.

Early life
Mesme Taşbağ was born in Iğdır, Turkey on July 9, 1981. She was educated in medicine at Ondokuz Mayıs University in Samsun graduating in 2008. She served five years long in her hometown in Iğdır. Currently, she works as a physician in the emergency service of the Yunus Emre Hospital in Eskişehir.

Sporting career
Taşbağ began in Iğdır with performing judo as she wanted to stay in shape. During this time, she developed keratoconus, a degenerative disorder of the eye leading to 40% loss of her visual acuity.

At the 2015 IBSA World Championships and Games in Seoul, South Korea, she took a bronze medal in the +70 kg event. She won the gold medal in the heavyweight (+70 kg) event at the 2015 IBSA European Judo Championships in Odivelas, Portugal. She obtained so a quota spot for the Judo at the 2016 Summer Paralympics in Rio de Janeiro, Brazil.

Taşbağ was the flag bearer at the parade of nations of Rio de Janeiro 2016. She won a bronze medal at the 2016 Summer Paralympics in Rio de Janeiro, Brazil.

References

Living people
1981 births
Sportspeople from Iğdır
Ondokuz Mayıs University alumni
Turkish women physicians
Turkish physicians
Turkish female judoka
Paralympic judoka of Turkey
Visually impaired category Paralympic competitors
Judoka at the 2016 Summer Paralympics
Paralympic bronze medalists for Turkey
Medalists at the 2016 Summer Paralympics
Paralympic medalists in judo
Paralympic athletes with a vision impairment
21st-century Turkish physicians
21st-century women physicians
20th-century Turkish sportswomen
21st-century Turkish sportswomen
Turkish blind people